Cao Xianming (born February 13, 1976, in Qiqihar, China) is a Chinese former ice dancer. He competes with Zhang Weina. They are multiple Chinese national champions. They placed 22nd at the 2002 Winter Olympics.

Cao is now an International Judge for China.

Cao Xianmning currently also coaches his daughter Cao Luchang, also an ice dancer

Results
GP: Champions Series / Grand Prix

With Zhang

References

External links
 

Chinese male ice dancers
Olympic figure skaters of China
Figure skaters at the 2002 Winter Olympics
1976 births
Figure skating judges
Living people
Sportspeople from Qiqihar
Asian Games medalists in figure skating
Figure skaters at the 1996 Asian Winter Games
Figure skaters at the 2003 Asian Winter Games
Medalists at the 1996 Asian Winter Games
Medalists at the 2003 Asian Winter Games
Asian Games gold medalists for China
Asian Games bronze medalists for China
Figure skaters from Heilongjiang
Competitors at the 1997 Winter Universiade
Competitors at the 1999 Winter Universiade